Qazi Fazlur Rahman is a Bangladeshi retired career bureaucrat and former adviser, with the rank of minister, of Shahabuddin Ahmed caretaker government. He was in charge of the Ministry of Irrigation, Forest, Environment, Fisheries and Livestock. He is a trustee of Gono University.

References

Living people
Advisors of Caretaker Government of Bangladesh
Year of birth missing (living people)
Bangladeshi civil servants